The men's 4 × 100 metres relay event at the 1948 Olympic Games took place on August 6 & August 7. The United States team won the final, but was initially disqualified when officials thought the pass between Barney Ewell and Lorenzo Wright had taken place outside the zone.  After further review, officials saw that the pass took place inside the zone, and restored U.S. results.

Records
Prior to the competition, the existing World and Olympic records were as follows.

Schedule
All times are British Summer Time (UTC+1)

Results

Round 1
Round 1 took place on 6 August. The first two teams from each heat advanced to the final.

Heat 1

Heat 2

Heat 3

Final

References

External links
Organising Committee for the XIV Olympiad, The (1948). The Official Report of the Organising Committee for the XIV Olympiad. LA84 Foundation. Retrieved 4 September 2016.

Men's 4x100 metre relay
Relay foot races at the Olympics
4 × 100 metres relay
Men's events at the 1948 Summer Olympics